Aleš Padělek (born 1 January 1980) is a Czech ice hockey left wing for BK Havlíčkův Brod of the 2nd Czech Republic Hockey League. He previously spent five seasons playing for the Peterborough Phantoms.

He has represented Czech Republic internationally.

Personal life
Padělek's older brother Ivan is a retired right wing who played in the Czech Extraliga.

Career statistics

Regular season and playoffs

International

Awards and honours

References

External links

1980 births
Living people
HC '05 Banská Bystrica players
HC Berounští Medvědi players
Czech ice hockey left wingers
HC Dukla Jihlava players
BK Havlíčkův Brod players
SK Horácká Slavia Třebíč players
LHK Jestřábi Prostějov players
HC Karlovy Vary players
BK Mladá Boleslav players
Orli Znojmo players
Peterborough Phantoms players
HC Plzeň players
HC Slezan Opava players
Slough Jets players
Sydney Bears players
HC Tábor players
HC Vítkovice players
Sportspeople from Jihlava
Czech expatriate ice hockey players in Slovakia
Czech expatriate sportspeople in England
Czech expatriate sportspeople in Australia
Expatriate ice hockey players in Australia
Expatriate ice hockey players in England